This is a list of electoral results for the Electoral division of Victoria River in Northern Territory elections.

Members for Victoria River

Election results

Elections in the 1970s

 Preferences were not distributed.
 The number of votes each individual Independent received is unknown.

 Preferences were not distributed.

Elections in the 1980s

 Preferences were not distributed.

Elections in the 1990s

References

Northern Territory electoral results by district